"Break Away" is a song by the American rock band the Beach Boys that was recorded during the early sessions for their album Sunflower and issued as a non-album single on June 16, 1969. It was written by Brian and Murry Wilson, although Murry was credited as lyricist under the pseudonym "Reggie Dunbar". Dennis Wilson's "Celebrate the News" was chosen as the B-side. The single peaked at number 63 in the US and number 6 in the UK.

Background
According to Brian, Murry came up with the idea for the song from watching The Joey Bishop Show on television while it proclaimed, "We're gonna break away for a minute and we'll be right back!". Brian, at his piano, then composed the song with Murry as they "plunked and plunked and plunked" and "finally got a song going." At another time, Brian said that the Monkees inspired him to write this song. The Monkees had appeared on the aforementioned television program on April 29, 1969, but "Break Away" was recorded prior to that date.

Asked why Murry had used a pseudonym, Brian responded that his father "didn't want anyone to know that he wrote it with me." On another occasion, Brian gave a different answer to the same journalist, saying "I don't know. He was nutty. He was crazy, that was his fictitious name."

Brian Wilson spoke positively of the song in a later interview, commenting, "That's a beautiful song. I think it might be one of my most underrated songs."

Charts

References

External links
 
 

1969 singles
Capitol Records singles
The Beach Boys songs
Songs written by Brian Wilson
Song recordings produced by Brian Wilson
1969 songs